Bergisch Gladbach is a city in the Cologne/Bonn Region of North Rhine-Westphalia, Germany, and capital of the Rheinisch-Bergischer Kreis (district).

Geography
Bergisch Gladbach is located east of the river Rhine, approx. 10 kilometers east of Cologne.

Neighbouring municipalities
Beginning in the north clockwise the neighbouring municipalities and neighbouring towns are: Odenthal, Kürten, Overath, Rösrath, Cologne and Leverkusen.

History
Early settlements existed in the 13th century, but the town was officially founded in 1856.

The word Bergisch in the name does not originate from its location in the county of Berg and was not added to distinguish it from Mönchengladbach as believed by many people, but from the counts who gave their name to the region.
At the start of the 12th century the counts of Berg settled in the area and it later became the duchy (under Napoleon, the grand duchy) of Berg. This is where the first part of the name (Bergisch) comes from, the town being located in the former county of Berg. It is the administrative headquarters ('Kreisstadt') of the Rheinish-Bergisch district (or 'Kreis').

The second part of the name, Gladbach (cognate with English Ladbrooke) originates from Low Rhenish (Bergisches Platt) and means canalised stream, referring to the small river (the Strunde) that was artificially canalised (laid) in early medieval times. In  Bergisch Platt, the regional dialect, laid is said gelaat, a word which eventually evolved to glad (in this case the 'd' is pronounced as a 't'). The second part of the word, bach is the standard German word for a small stream, referring in this case to the Strunde.

In 1975 the town incorporated neighbouring Bensberg and when it reached a population of 100,000 in 1977 it was given city status.

Economy
Paper manufacturing, printing, glass wool manufacturing, chocolate, and high-tech industries make up a large part of Bergisch Gladbach's economy.

Politics

Mayor
The current mayor of Bergisch Gladbach is Frank Stein of the Social Democratic Party (SPD). The most recent mayoral election was held on 13 September 2020, and the results were as follows:

! colspan=2| Candidate
! Party
! Votes
! %
|-
| bgcolor=| 
| align=left| Frank Stein
| align=left| Social Democratic Party
| 25,321
| 52.3
|-
| bgcolor=| 
| align=left| Christian Buchen
| align=left| Christian Democratic Union
| 18,973
| 39.2
|-
| 
| align=left| Iro Herrmann
| align=left| Citizens' Party GL
| 2,093
| 4.3
|-
| bgcolor=| 
| align=left| Günther Schöpf
| align=left| Alternative for Germany
| 2,014
| 4.2
|-
! colspan=3| Valid votes
! 48,401
! 99.3
|-
! colspan=3| Invalid votes
! 358
! 0.7
|-
! colspan=3| Total
! 48,759
! 100.0
|-
! colspan=3| Electorate/voter turnout
! 89,995
! 54.2
|-
| colspan=7| Source: City of Bergisch Gladbach
|}

City council

The Bergisch Gladbach city council governs the city alongside the Mayor. The most recent city council election was held on 13 September 2020, and the results were as follows:

! colspan=2| Party
! Votes
! %
! +/-
! Seats
! +/-
|-
| bgcolor=| 
| align=left| Christian Democratic Union (CDU)
| 17,463
| 36.2
|  5.7
| 20
|  6
|-
| bgcolor=| 
| align=left| Alliance 90/The Greens (Grüne)
| 13,858
| 28.7
|  12.8
| 16
|  6
|-
| bgcolor=| 
| align=left| Social Democratic Party (SPD)
| 9,209
| 19.1
|  5.0
| 10
|  5
|-
| bgcolor=| 
| align=left| Free Democratic Party (FDP)
| 2,438
| 5.1
|  0.5
| 3
| ±0
|-
| bgcolor=| 
| align=left| Alternative for Germany (AfD)
| 2,213
| 4.6
|  0.2
| 3
| ±0
|-
| 
| align=left| Citizens' Party GL (BGL)
| 1,398
| 2.9
|  1.2
| 2
|  1
|-
| 
| align=left| Free Voters' Association Bergisch Gladbach (FWG)
| 1,645
| 3.4
| New
| 2
| New
|-
! colspan=2| Valid votes
! 48,224
! 98.8
! 
! 
! 
|-
! colspan=2| Invalid votes
! 597
! 1.2
! 
! 
! 
|-
! colspan=2| Total
! 48,821
! 100.0
! 
! 56
!  6
|-
! colspan=2| Electorate/voter turnout
! 89,995
! 52.3
!  0.1
! 
! 
|-
| colspan=7| Source: City of Bergisch Gladbach
|}

Twin towns – sister cities

Bergisch Gladbach is twinned with:

 Beit Jala, Palestine (2010)
 Bourgoin-Jallieu, France (1956)
 Ganei Tikva, Israel (2012)
 Joinville-le-Pont, France (1960)
 Limassol, Cyprus (1991)
 Luton, England (1956)
 Marijampolė, Lithuania (1989)
 Pszczyna, Poland (1993)
 Runnymede, England (1995)
 Velsen, Netherlands (1956)

Notable people
 Markus von Ahlen (born 1971), footballer and coach
 Rüdiger Baldauf (born 1961), jazz musician
 Astrid Benöhr (born 1957), endurance athlete
 Sebastian Blomberg (born 1972), actor
 Wolfgang Bosbach (born 1952), politician (CDU)
 Karl Budde (1850–1935), Protestant theologian
 Armin Falk (born 1968), economist
 Markus Feldenkirchen (born 1975), journalist
 Vanessa Fuchs (born 1996), Germany's Next Topmodel winner of the season 2015
 Kerstin Gier (born 1966), author
 Volker Goetze (born 1972), German born, New York based musician composer and filmmaker
 Fabian Hambüchen (born 1987), artistic gymnast
 Götz Heidelberg (1923–2017), physicist, constructor and entrepreneur 
 Waldemar Henrici (1878–1950), general and Reichsarbeitsdienstführer
 Mats Hummels (born 1988), footballer
 Hubert Käppel (born 1951), guitarist and music pedagogue
 Brigitte Kraus (born 1956), middle distance runner
 Georg Koch (born 1972), football goalkeeper
 Heidi Klum (born 1973), model and presenter
 Carolin Kebekus (born 1980), comedian, singer and actress
 Theo Koll (born 1958), journalist
 German Mäurer (1811–1885), Prussian writer 
 Veronika Moos-Brochhagen (born 1961), textile artist
 Benyamin Nuss (born 1989), pianist
 Bastian Oczipka (born 1989), footballer
 Uwe Ommer (born 1943), act, fashion and advertising photos
 Monika Piel (born 1951), journalist and presenter
 Tibor Pleiß (born 1989), basketball player
 Karin Sander (born 1957), artist 
 David Schnell (born 1971), painter
 Tim Wiese (born 1981), German football goalkeeper and wrestler

Secondary schools in Bergisch Gladbach
 Albertus-Magnus-Gymnasium Bensberg/Bergisch Gladbach
 Gymnasium Herkenrath/Bergisch Gladbach
 Nicolaus-Cusanus-Gymnasium Bergisch Gladbach
 Otto-Hahn-Gymnasium Bensberg/Bergisch Gladbach
 Dietrich-Bonhoeffer-Gymnasium Bergisch Gladbach
 Integrierte-Gesamtschule-Paffrath Bergisch Gladbach

See also
 Gustav Stresemann Institute

References

External links

  
 Fire Department Bergisch Gladbach 

 
Cities in North Rhine-Westphalia
Districts of the Rhine Province